Mlondi Mdluli (11 December 1984 – 4 September 2006) was a Swazi footballer who played as a goalkeeper.

Career

In 2006, Mdludi joined Alabama A&M Bulldogs in the United States.

References

External links

 

1984 births
2006 deaths
Alabama A&M Bulldogs men's soccer players
Association football goalkeepers
Road incident deaths in Eswatini
Eswatini international footballers
Manzini Wanderers F.C. players
Swazi expatriate footballers
Swazi expatriate sportspeople in the United States
Swazi footballers